Protorthodes perforata is a moth in the family Noctuidae first described by Augustus Radcliffe Grote in 1883. It is found across the southern United States, from western Texas to southern California and southward to central Mexico.

The length of the forewings is 12–14 mm. The forewings are pale whitish gray to buffy gray with darker gray reniform and orbicular spots, each is outlined by a contrastingly pale line. The hindwings are dirty white with fuscous shading on the margins and veins in both sexes. Adults have been recorded on wing from early April to early July and again from mid-August to late October.

References

Moths described in 1883
Hadeninae